André Dumont (24 May 1764 at Oisemont – 19 October 1838 at Abbeville), was  a French parliamentarian, a regicide, a deputy of the National Convention, President of the National convention, and an administrator of the First Empire.

1764 births
1838 deaths
Regicides of Louis XVI
Presidents of the National Convention